The 2022 24 Hours of Spa (also known as the TotalEnergies 24 Hours of Spa for sponsorship reasons) was the 74th running of the 24 Hours of Spa. It took place from 28 July–31 July 2022. The race was a part of both the 2022 GT World Challenge Europe Endurance Cup and the 2022 Intercontinental GT Challenge.

Background

Supporting the race weekend were the GT4 European Series, Lamborghini Super Trofeo Europe, French F4 Championship, Formula Regional European Championship and GT Anniversary by Peter Auto.

Entry list

A 66-car field gathered to contest the race - 23 in Pro class, 19 in Silver Cup, 15 in Gold Cup, 7 in Pro-Am Cup and 2 in Bronze Cup. 9 manufacturers were represented, with 14 Mercedes cars, 13 Porsche cars, 11 Audi cars, 10 Lamborghini cars, 5 BMW cars, 5 Ferrari cars, 4 Aston Martin cars, 3 McLaren cars and 1 Bentley car.